The Anglican Province of Christ the King (APCK) is a Continuing Anglican church with traditional forms both of doctrine and liturgy.  It is considered one of the more Anglo-Catholic jurisdictions among Continuing Anglican church bodies.

History

At the founding of the Continuing Anglican movement in 1977 at the Congress of St. Louis, a proposed constitution for a new Anglican church in North America was put before the four existing dioceses for ratification. The two which did ratify the constitution later adopted the name Anglican Catholic Church. The two which did not ratify because of concerns that the role of the new church's bishops was overly narrow, elected to continue under the original name of the movement. One of these non-ratifying dioceses, the Diocese of the Southeastern States, dissolved within a short time leaving only the Diocese of Christ the King under its bishop ordinary, Robert Morse of California.

On June 29, 2007, James E. Provence was elected as successor to Morse upon the latter's retirement as archbishop of the province. Morse continued as provost of St. Joseph of Arimathea Anglican Theological Seminary which he was instrumental in founding in 1979. Provence resigned on July 20, 2015, and Frederick G. Morrison was elected to succeed him as archbishop. Morrison retired on January 1, 2020, and was replaced by Archbishop John E Upham.

The publishing arm of the APCK is known as the American Church Union (ACU).

Name
A new name, Province of Christ the King, was adopted as the church expanded to become a nationwide jurisdiction spanning the United States. The province was later known as the Anglican Province of Christ the King.

Parishes
The APCK has over forty parishes across three dioceses organized geographically. Sixteen of its parishes are in California, and its seminary, Saint Joseph of Arimathea Anglican Theological College, is located one block south of the University of California, Berkeley.

On July 25, 2007, the bishop and most of the parishes in the Eastern Diocese of the APCK withdrew, joining the Anglican Church in America. However, four of its parishes decided to remain within the APCK.

References

External links
 
Official site of Saint Joseph of Arimathea Anglican Theological College
Report on the Withdrawal of the Eastern Diocese.

Anglo-Catholicism
Christian organizations established in 1977
Anglican denominations in North America
Continuing Anglican denominations
Anglican denominations established in the 20th century
Christ the King
Province of Christ the King
1977 establishments in the United States